Samuel Adams Warner (1822–1897) was an American architect. He studied architecture in his father Cyrus L. Warner's office and partnered  with his younger brother Benjamin Warner from 1862 to 1868. He designed dry goods merchant buildings for H.B. Claflin Co., S.B. Chittendon & Co., Charles St. John, and H.D. Aldrich. He also designed the Marble Collegiate Church and several buildings in SoHo's Cast Iron Historic District from 1879 and 1895.

Benjamin Warner is credited with designing 33 Greene Street at the Northwest corner of Grand Street (1873).

Work
Samuel Adams Warner House (1875), the architect's home, which he designed, in Roslyn, New York
Marble Collegiate Church (1851–1854), a Gothic Revival architecture church at 1 West 29th Street on the Northwest corner of 5th Avenue in New York City
Presbyterian Church of the Redeemer (now Our Lady of Peace Roman Catholic Church) (1886–1887) at 239 East 62nd Street between 2nd Ave. and 3rd Avenue in New York City
16-18 Greene Street, NYC
20-26 Greene Street (1880), NYC
39-41 Worth Street
600 Broadway (1884)
545 Broadway (1885) West Side
426-432 Broadway  1888-89

Gallery of buildings designed by Warner

References

1822 births
1897 deaths
People from Roslyn, New York
19th-century American architects